Marcos Hocevar (born 26 September 1955) is a former professional tennis player from Brazil.

During his career he finished runner-up at 2 singles events and won 1 doubles title.  He achieved a career-high singles ranking of World No. 30 in 1983 and a career-high doubles ranking of World No. 86 in 1985.

Hocevar was the recipient of the first recorded Golden set in competitive male tennis, losing to Bill Scanlon 2–6, 0–6 at Delray Beach in 1983.

Singles runners-up (2)

Doubles titles (1)

References

External links
 
 
 

Brazilian male tennis players
Sportspeople from Porto Alegre
People from Ijuí
1955 births
Living people
21st-century Brazilian people
20th-century Brazilian people